Luis Llosa Urquidi (born 1951) is a Peruvian film director.  He is best known for Sniper, The Specialist, and Anaconda.

Career 
Luis Llosa was originally a film critic.  He is known for his early Peruvian work, English-language exploitation films made for producer Roger Corman, and bigger-budget American films.  His best-known film, Anaconda, stars Jennifer Lopez, Ice Cube, Jon Voight, and Eric Stoltz. Anaconda was nominated for multiple Razzie Awards, including worst director, but grossed $136 million worldwide and became a cult film.

He founded Iguana Productions, which produces Peruvian films and telenovelas such as Escándalo, Torbellino and Latin Lover.

Personal life 
Llosa was born in 1951 in Lima, Peru. He is a cousin of Peruvian novelist Mario Vargas Llosa, and his niece is film director Claudia Llosa.

Filmography 
 1987 Hour of the Assassin
 1989 Crime Zone
 1993 Sniper
 1993 Eight Hundred Leagues Down the Amazon
 1993 Fire on the Amazon
 1994 The Specialist
 1997 Anaconda
 2005 The Feast of the Goat

References

External links 
 
 Iguana Producciones 

Living people
Luis, Llosa
1951 births
People from Lima